The Firefly is a British sailboat that was designed by Uffa Fox as a one design racer and first built in 1946. The boat was originally named the Sea Swallow. It was an Olympic class and raced at the 1948 Olympics.

Production
The design was initially built by Fairey Marine in the United Kingdom, starting in 1946. Today it is built by Rondar Raceboats in the UK and Whitecap Composites in the United States and remains in production.

Design
The Firefly is a recreational sailing dinghy, initially built predominantly of hot-moulded plywood, glassfibre construction was authorized by the class starting in 1965. A rotating mast was introduced in 1970.

The design has a fractional sloop rig, a plumb stem and transom, a transom-hung rudder controlled by a tiller and a retractable centreboard. It displaces .

The design is raced without a spinnaker.

The Firefly has a Portsmouth Yardstick handicap of 1168 (in the RYA scheme) and a D-PN of 99.6 in the US Sailing system.

Operational history

The boat is supported by an active class club that organizes racing events, the National Firefly Association.

The first four production boats built by Fairey were purchased by the commodore of the Itchenor Sailing Club, Sir Geoffrey Loules and named Fe, Fi, Fo and Fum.

Even though it was designed for a crew of two sailors, the boat was selected for the 1948 Olympics as a single-handed boat. The Olympic sailing events that year were held at Torbay and the gold medal was won by Danish sailor, Paul Elvstrøm. It was replaced as an Olympic class in 1952 by the Finn.

The National Maritime Museum Cornwall notes, "the Firefly was one of the first production dinghies ever built in large numbers, long before the days of glass reinforced plastic boats, and there is no doubt that it put dinghy sailing within financial reach of many people – the initial cost of a boat was £65."

Boats on display
 National Maritime Museum Cornwall - the first production boat, Fe.

See also
List of sailing boat types

References

External links

Rondar official website
Whitecap official website

Dinghies
1940s sailboat type designs
Olympic sailing classes
Sailboat type designs by Uffa Fox
Sailboat types built by Fairey Marine
Sailboat types built by Rondar Raceboats
Sailboat types built by Whitecap Composites